Aankhen (meaning The Eyes) is a 1950 Bollywood family drama film directed by Devendra Goel and starring Shekhar, Bharat Bhushan and Nalini Jaywant. A moderate box office success, the film became the tenth highest earning Indian film of 1950, earning an approximate gross of Rs. 72,00,000 and a net of Rs. 40,00,000.
Mukesh was one of the playback singers.

Cast
Shekhar
Bharat Bhushan
Nalini Jaywant
Cuckoo
Yakub
Yashodra Katju
Bhudo Advani
Anwari

Music
"Hum Ishq Mein Barbaad" by Mohammed Rafi
"Humse Nain Milana" by Mukesh and Shamshad Begum
"Humse Na Dil Ko Lagana" by Shamshad Begum and Madan Mohan
"Rail Mein Jiya Mora" by Raj Khosla
"Preet Laga Ke Maine" by Mukesh
"Milne Ki Tamanna Jin Se Thi" by Shamshad Begum
"Mohabbat Karne Walon Ka" by Shamshad Begum
"Meri Atariya Pe Kaga" by Meena Kapoor

References
2.  Aahuti Songs by Hindi Songs Lyrics

External links
 

1950 films
1950s Hindi-language films
1950 drama films
Indian drama films
Films scored by Madan Mohan
Films directed by Devendra Goel
Hindi-language drama films
Indian black-and-white films